There are 57 species of birds that have been recorded on Niue, of which one has been introduced by humans. Two species are globally threatened.

There are no endemic species surviving today but there are endemic subspecies of the Polynesian triller and Polynesian starling. There are 15 breeding species of which eleven are landbirds and four are seabirds. Studies of fossil birds suggest that Niue's avifauna was formerly more diverse. Birds recorded from subfossil remains predating Polynesian settlement of the island include the Niue night heron (Nycticorax kalavikai), Tongan megapode (Megapodius pritchardii) and the Niue rail (Gallirallus huiatua).

This list's taxonomic treatment (designation and sequence of orders, families and species) and nomenclature (common and scientific names) follow the conventions of The Clements Checklist of Birds of the World, 2022 edition. The family accounts at the beginning of each heading reflect this taxonomy, as do the species counts found in each family account. Introduced and accidental species are included in the total counts for Niue. There are unconfirmed reports of the red-tailed tropicbird (Phaethon rubricauda), Pacific black duck (Anas superciliosa) and sharp-tailed sandpiper (Calidris acuminata) but these are not included in the list.

The following tags have been used to highlight several categories, but not all species fall into one of these categories. Those that do not are commonly occurring native species.

(A) Accidental – a species that rarely or accidentally occurs in Niue
(I) Introduced – a species introduced to Niue as a consequence, direct or indirect, of human actions

Ducks, geese, and waterfowl
Order: AnseriformesFamily: Anatidae

The family Anatidae includes the ducks and most duck-like waterfowl, such as geese and swans. These are adapted for an aquatic existence, with webbed feet, bills that are flattened to a greater or lesser extent, and feathers that are excellent at shedding water due to special oils.

Pacific black duck, Anas superciliosa (A)
Mallard, Anas platyrhynchos (A)

Pheasants, grouse, and allies
Order: GalliformesFamily: Phasianidae

The Phasianidae are a family of terrestrial birds which consists of quails, partridges, snowcocks, francolins, spurfowls, tragopans, monals, pheasants, peafowls and jungle fowls. In general, they are plump (although they vary in size) and have broad, relatively short wings.

Red junglefowl, Gallus gallus (I)

Pigeons and doves
Order: ColumbiformesFamily: Columbidae

Pigeons and doves are stout-bodied birds with short necks and short slender bills with a fleshy cere.

Many-colored fruit dove, Ptilinopus perousii
Crimson-crowned fruit dove, Ptilinopus porphyraceus
Pacific imperial-pigeon, Ducula pacifica

Cuckoos
Order: CuculiformesFamily: Cuculidae

The family Cuculidae includes cuckoos, roadrunners and anis. These birds are of variable size with slender bodies, long tails and strong legs. The Old World cuckoos are brood parasites.

Long-tailed koel, Eudynamys taitensis

Swifts
Order: CaprimulgiformesFamily: Apodidae

Swifts are small birds which spend the majority of their lives flying. These birds have very short legs and never settle voluntarily on the ground, perching instead only on vertical surfaces. Many swifts have long swept-back wings which resemble a crescent or boomerang.

White-rumped swiftlet, Aerodramus spodiopygius
Australian swiftlet, Aerodramus terraereginae

Rails, gallinules, and coots

Order: GruiformesFamily: Rallidae

Rallidae is a large family of small to medium-sized birds which includes the rails, crakes, coots and gallinules. Typically they inhabit dense vegetation in damp environments near lakes, swamps or rivers. In general they are shy and secretive birds, making them difficult to observe. Most species have strong legs and long toes which are well adapted to soft uneven surfaces. They tend to have short, rounded wings and to be weak fliers.

Buff-banded rail, Gallirallus philippensis
Australasian swamphen, Porphyrio melanotus (A)
Spotless crake, Zapornia tabuensis

Plovers and lapwings
Order: CharadriiformesFamily: Charadriidae

The family Charadriidae includes the plovers, dotterels and lapwings. They are small to medium-sized birds with compact bodies, short, thick necks and long, usually pointed, wings. They are found in open country worldwide, mostly in habitats near water.

Pacific golden-plover, Pluvialis fulva

Sandpipers and allies

Order: CharadriiformesFamily: Scolopacidae

Scolopacidae is a large diverse family of small to medium-sized shorebirds including the sandpipers, curlews, godwits, shanks, tattlers, woodcocks, snipes, dowitchers and phalaropes. The majority of these species eat small invertebrates picked out of the mud or soil. Variation in length of legs and bills enables multiple species to feed in the same habitat, particularly on the coast, without direct competition for food.

Bristle-thighed curlew, Numenius tahitiensis (A)
Far Eastern curlew, Numenius madagascariensis (A)
Eurasian curlew, Numenius arquata (A)
Bar-tailed godwit, Limosa lapponica (A)
Ruddy turnstone, Arenaria interpres
Sanderling, Calidris alba
Pectoral sandpiper, Calidris melanotos (A)
Wandering tattler, Tringa incana

Gulls, terns, and skimmers

Order: CharadriiformesFamily: Laridae

Laridae is a family of medium to large seabirds, the gulls, terns, and skimmers. Gulls are typically grey or white, often with black markings on the head or wings. They have stout, longish bills and webbed feet. Terns are a group of generally medium to large seabirds typically with grey or white plumage, often with black markings on the head. Most terns hunt fish by diving but some pick insects off the surface of fresh water. Terns are generally long-lived birds, with several species known to live in excess of 30 years.

Kelp gull, Larus dominicanus (A)
Brown noddy, Anous stolidus
Black noddy, Anous minutus
Blue-gray noddy, Anous ceruleus
White tern, Gygis alba
Black-naped tern, Sterna sumatrana
Great crested tern, Thalasseus bergii

Tropicbirds

Order: PhaethontiformesFamily: Phaethontidae

Tropicbirds are slender white birds of tropical oceans, with exceptionally long central tail feathers. Their heads and long wings have black markings.

White-tailed tropicbird, Phaethon lepturus

Southern storm-petrels
Order: ProcellariiformesFamily: Oceanitidae

The southern storm-petrels are the smallest seabirds, relatives of the petrels, feeding on planktonic crustaceans and small fish picked from the surface, typically while hovering. Their flight is fluttering and sometimes bat-like.

White-bellied storm-petrel, Fregetta grallaria 
Polynesian storm-petrel, Nesofregetta fuliginosa

Shearwaters and petrels
Order: ProcellariiformesFamily: Procellariidae

The procellariids are the main group of medium-sized "true petrels", characterised by united nostrils with medium septum and a long outer functional primary.

Southern giant-petrel, Macronectes giganteus (A)
Kermadec petrel, Pterodroma neglecta
Herald petrel, Pterodroma heraldica
Mottled petrel, Pterodroma inexpectata
White-necked petrel, Pterodroma cervicalis
Black-winged petrel, Pterodroma nigripennis
Collared petrel, Pterodroma brevipes
Phoenix petrel, Pterodroma alba
Tahiti petrel, Pseudobulweria rostrata
Wedge-tailed shearwater, Ardenna pacificus
Buller's shearwater, Ardenna bulleri
Sooty shearwater, Ardenna grisea
Short-tailed shearwater, Ardenna tenuirostris
Tropical shearwater, Puffinus bailloni

Frigatebirds
Order: SuliformesFamily: Fregatidae

Frigatebirds are large seabirds usually found over tropical oceans. They are large, black and white or completely black, with long wings and deeply forked tails. The males have coloured inflatable throat pouches. They do not swim or walk and cannot take off from a flat surface. Having the largest wingspan-to-body-weight ratio of any bird, they are essentially aerial, able to stay aloft for more than a week.

Lesser frigatebird, Fregata ariel
Great frigatebird, Fregata minor (A)

Boobies and gannets
Order: SuliformesFamily: Sulidae]

The sulids comprise the gannets and boobies. Both groups are medium-large coastal seabirds that plunge-dive for fish.

Masked booby, Sula dactylatra (A)
Brown booby, Sula leucogaster

Herons, egrets, and bitterns

Order: PelecaniformesFamily: Ardeidae

The family Ardeidae contains the bitterns, herons, and egrets. Herons and egrets are medium to large wading birds with long necks and legs. Bitterns tend to be shorter necked and more wary. Members of Ardeidae fly with their necks retracted, unlike other long-necked birds such as storks, ibises and spoonbills.

White-faced heron, Egretta novaehollandiae (A)
Pacific reef-heron, Egretta sacra (A)

Barn-owls

Order: StrigiformesFamily: Tytonidae

Barn-owls are medium to large owls with large heads and characteristic heart-shaped faces. They have long strong legs with powerful talons.

Barn owl, Tyto alba

Old World parrots

Order: PsittaciformesFamily: Psittaculidae

Blue-crowned lorikeet, Vini australis

Cuckooshrikes

Order: PasseriformesFamily: Campephagidae

The cuckooshrikes are small to medium-sized passerine birds. They are predominantly greyish with white and black, although some species are brightly coloured.

Polynesian triller, Lalage maculosa

Bulbuls
Order: PasseriformesFamily: Pycnonotidae

Bulbuls are medium-sized songbirds. Some are colourful with yellow, red or orange vents, cheeks, throats or supercilia, but most are drab, with uniform olive-brown to black plumage. Some species have distinct crests.

Red-vented bulbul, Pycnonotus cafer (A)

Starlings
Order: PasseriformesFamily: Sturnidae

Starlings are small to medium-sized passerine birds. Their flight is strong and direct and they are very gregarious. Their preferred habitat is fairly open country. They eat insects and fruit. Plumage is typically dark with a metallic sheen.

Polynesian starling, Aplonis tabuensis

See also
List of birds
Lists of birds by region

References

Niue
 
Lists of biota of Niue